
Gmina Sztum is an urban-rural gmina (administrative district) in Sztum County, Pomeranian Voivodeship, in northern Poland.

Villages
Apart from the town of Sztum, Gmina Sztum contains the villages and settlements of Barlewice, Barlewiczki, Biała Góra, Brzezi Ostrów, Cygusy, Czernin, Goraj, Górki, Gościszewo, Gronajny, Grzępa, Kępina, Koniecwałd, Koślinka, Kuliki, Lipka, Michorowo, Nowa Wieś, Nowiny, Parowy, Parpary, Piekło, Pietrzwałd, Polaszki, Postolin, Ramzy Małe, Ramzy Wielkie, Szpitalna Wieś, Sztumska Wieś, Sztumskie Pole, Uśnice, Węgry and Zajezierze.

Neighbouring gminas
Gmina Sztum is bordered by the gminas of Gniew, Malbork, Mikołajki Pomorskie, Miłoradz, Pelplin, Ryjewo and Stary Targ.

References
Polish official population figures 2006

Sztum
Sztum County